Cotynessa abatinga is a species of beetle in the family Cerambycidae, the only species in the genus Cotynessa.

References

Ectenessini